Lezhnevo is an urban-type settlement and the administrative center of Lezhnevsky District, Ivanovo Oblast, Russia. Population:

Gallery

References

Notes

Sources

Urban-type settlements in Ivanovo Oblast
Vladimir Governorate